Farsatullah (born 1 July 1954) is an Indian former cricketer. He played first-class cricket for Bengal and Railways.

See also
 List of Bengal cricketers

References

External links
 

1954 births
Living people
Indian cricketers
Bengal cricketers
Railways cricketers
Cricketers from Allahabad